The discography of Serbian singer Ceca includes eighteen studio albums, two remix albums, seven video albums, twelve compilations, eight singles and fifty music videos.

Albums

Studio albums

Remix albums

Video albums

Compilation albums

Singles

Music videos

References

External links
 
 
 

Discographies of Serbian artists
Pop music discographies
Folk music discographies